Daoneua Siviengxay (born 10 December 1991) is a Laotian footballer who plays for Vientiane. He played for Laos national football team at the 2012 AFF Suzuki Cup.

References

External links

1991 births
Living people
Laotian footballers
Laos international footballers
Place of birth missing (living people)

Association footballers not categorized by position